Common dotted border may refer to the following African butterflies:

Mylothris agathina or the eastern dotted border
Mylothris chloris or the western dotted border
Mylothris rhodope, the Rhodope or tropical dotted border